Walter Dießner (born 26 December 1954) is a retired German rower who had his best achievements in the coxed fours. In this event he won a silver and a gold medal at the 1976 and 1980 Olympics, respectively, as well as four world titles in 1974, 1977, 1978 and 1979.

His twin brother Ullrich rowed together with Walter in most competitions. The brothers have different birth dates because Walter was born before midnight and Ullrich shortly thereafter.

References

1954 births
Living people
People from Meissen
People from Bezirk Dresden
East German male rowers
Sportspeople from Saxony
German twins
Twin sportspeople
Olympic rowers of East Germany
Rowers at the 1976 Summer Olympics
Rowers at the 1980 Summer Olympics
Olympic gold medalists for East Germany
Olympic silver medalists for East Germany
Olympic medalists in rowing
World Rowing Championships medalists for East Germany
Medalists at the 1980 Summer Olympics
Medalists at the 1976 Summer Olympics
Recipients of the Patriotic Order of Merit in silver